Antiquity is an unincorporated community in Meigs County, in the U.S. state of Ohio.

History
A post office called Antiquity was established in 1878, and remained in operation until 1942. The community was named for the fact explorers carved their names on rocks near the town site.

References

Unincorporated communities in Meigs County, Ohio
Unincorporated communities in Ohio